Sean Bailey is an American film producer.

Sean Bailey may also refer to:

Sean Bailey (sprinter) (born 1997), Jamaican sprinter
Sean Bailey (climber) (born 1996), American rock climber

See also 
Shaun Bailey (disambiguation)